Progress in Cardiovascular Diseases is a bimonthly peer-reviewed medical journal covering cardiology. It was established in 1958 and is published by Elsevier. The editor-in-chief is Carl Lavie (Ochsner Medical Center). According to the Journal Citation Reports, the journal has a 2019 impact factor of 6.763 .

References

External links

Cardiology journals
Elsevier academic journals
Bimonthly journals
Publications established in 1958
English-language journals